The  is a Bo′Bo′+Bo′Bo′ wheel arrangement multi-system AC/DC two-unit electric locomotive type operated by JR Freight in Japan since 1997.

Operations
The locomotives are built at the Toshiba factory in Fuchū, Tokyo. Initially, they were all based at Sendai depot for use on long-distance container trains from the Tokyo area to Hokkaido via the Tohoku Main Line, replacing DC Class EF65s south of Kuroiso, pairs of AC Class ED75s north of Kuroiso, and pairs of AC Class ED79s through the Seikan Tunnel.

In 2004, locomotives EH500-25 and EH500-27 were loaned in turn to Moji depot in Kitakyushu for trials. From 2007, a number of EH500s were transferred to Moji depot for use on 1,300 tonne freight trains between Honshu and Kyushu through the Kanmon Tunnel, replacing ageing AC Class ED76s and dual-voltage EF81-300s and EF81-400s.

, the fleet totalled 82 locomotives (EH500-901 and EH500-1 to EH500-81). 12 locomotives, EH500-45 to EH500-50 and EH500-67 to EH500-72, are based at Moji Depot, and the other 70 members of the class are based at Sendai.

Variants
 EH500-901: Prototype
 EH500-1 – 2: Pre-series 1st batch
 EH500-3 – 9: Full-production 2nd batch
 EH500-10 –: 3rd batch

EH500-901
The prototype, EH500-901, was delivered to Sendai depot in September 1997 for extensive testing on the Tohoku Main Line and Kaikyo Line until March 1999. The livery is red and grey with black cab surrounds. It joined the rest of the Class EH500 fleet for use on revenue services from the start of the March 2000 timetable revision. "Kintaro Eco-Power" logos were added to the sides from December 2002.

1st batch: EH500-1 and EH500-2
Two pre-series locomotives, EH500-1 and EH500-2, were delivered in March 2000. These locomotives are finished in a livery of maroon and grey with black cab surrounds.

2nd batch: EH500-3 to EH500-9
Built from March 2000 to January 2001. The headlamps were moved to a higher position to reduce problems of blockage by snow. New "Kintaro Eco-Power" logos were added to the sides.

3rd batch: EH500-10 onward
Locomotives from EH500-10 (delivered in August 2001) onward are painted in a revised colour scheme using bright red instead of the earlier maroon colour. The black colour around the cab windows was also discontinued. Locomotives numbered EH500-15 onwards have narrower surrounds on the front-end headlight boxes, and the front-end white band is also correspondingly slightly thinner.

Classification

The EH500 classification for this locomotive type is explained below. As with previous locomotive designs, the prototype is numbered EH500-901, with subsequent production locomotives numbered from EH500-1 onward.
 E: Electric locomotive
 H: Eight driving axles
 500: AC/DC locomotive with AC motors

See also
 JNR Class EH10
 JR Freight Class EH200
 JR Freight Class EH800

References

1500 V DC locomotives
20 kV AC locomotives
Electric locomotives of Japan
EH500
1067 mm gauge locomotives of Japan
Railway locomotives introduced in 1998
Toshiba locomotives
Multi-system locomotives
Bo′Bo′+Bo′Bo′ locomotives